Like Previn! is the second jazz album by pianist André Previn and his trio. It was recorded on February 20 and March 1, 1960, at Contemporary Records' studio in Los Angeles. All eight compositions were written by Previn.

Despite being only his sophomore release with his own trio, Like Previn! was recorded when Previn was thirty-one years old and had already worked on music for over thirty motion pictures and came on the heels of two consecutive Academy Awards for his work on Gigi (1958) and Porgy & Bess (1959).

In his review, Scott Yanow states, "With fine assistance from bassist Red Mitchell and drummer Frankie Capp, Previn is in consistently swinging form on his originals and, even if none of the songs caught on, they make for a solid and varied set of bop-oriented music."

Track listing

"Rosie Red" - 4:38
"If I Should Find You" - 4:23
"Sad Eyes" - 5:35
"Saturday" - 6:26
"Tricycle" - 6:05
"I'm Mina Mood" - 8:25
"No Words for Dory" - 3:29
"Three's Company" - 5:38

Personnel
André Previn - piano
Frankie Capp - drums
Red Mitchell - double-bass
Roy DuNann & Howard Holzer - engineering
Lester Koenig - producer
Phil De Lancie - digital remastering (1994 re-release)

References

1960 albums
André Previn albums
Contemporary Records albums